The 2015–16 Louisville Cardinals women's basketball team will represent the University of Louisville during the 2015–16 NCAA Division I women's basketball season. The Cardinals, led by ninth-year head coach Jeff Walz, play their home games at the KFC Yum! Center and were in their second year in the Atlantic Coast Conference. They finished the season 26–8, 15–1 in ACC play to finish in second place. They advanced to the semifinals of the ACC women's tournament where they lost to Syracuse. They received at-large bid of the NCAA women's tournament where they defeated Central Arkansas in the first round before losing to DePaul in the second round.

Roster

Media
Once again select Cardinals games will be broadcast on WHAS. Some of the games will be on the ACC RSN. Additional ACC games will air on ESPN3.

All Cardinals basketball games will air on Learfield Sports on WKRD 790 AM or WVKY 101.7 FM, depending on conflicts with Louisville and Kentucky football and men's basketball games.

Schedule

|-
!colspan=9 style="background:#000000; color:#D81E05;"| Regular season

|-
!colspan=9 style="background:#000000;"| ACC Women's Tournament

|-
!colspan=9 style="background:#000000;"| NCAA Women's Tournament

Source

Rankings
2015–16 NCAA Division I women's basketball rankings

See also
Louisville Cardinals women's basketball
2015–16 Louisville Cardinals men's basketball team

References

Louisville Cardinals women's basketball seasons
Louisville
Louisville
Louisville Cardinals women's basketball, 2015-16
Louisville Cardinals women's basketball, 2015-16